For the Summer Olympics, there were a total of 45 venues starting with the letter 'M' and 19 venues starting with the letter 'N'.

M

N

References

 List M-N